Bácum Municipality is a municipality of southwestern Sonora, in northwestern Mexico.  The population was 21,322 in 2005.

Geography
Bácum Municipality is located in one of the two valleys of the Yaqui River. The area of the municipality is 1,409.7 km² (544.3 mi²)  It is bounded by the Municipalities of Cajeme in the east and Guaymas in the west — and the Gulf of California in the south.  

County seat
The county seat of Bácum Municipality is the town of Bácum.

The municipality lies next to the large urban center of Ciudad Obregón in Cajeme.

Yaqui Indians
The indigenous community is very large, with more than 9,000 residents identified as Yaqui in the 2000 census.

Economy
The Bácum Municipality's main economic activity is intensive agriculture, with more than 300 square kilometers under irrigation by canal.  The Yaqui River's water is used for irrigation in a system of canals. The main crops are wheat, corn, soybeans, barley, cotton, and garden vegetables, as well as seasonal crops such as alfalfa and some fruits. 

Some fishing is practiced. Industries are small, and consist chiefly of packing houses for vegetables and liquid fertilizer production.

See also
Bácum — town
Spanish missions in the Sonoran Desert
Municipalities of Sonora

References

Instituto Nacional de Estadistica, Geografia, e Informática
Enciclopedia de los Municipios de Mexico

Municipalities of Sonora